Mimi Pinson is a 1958 French comedy-drama film directed by Robert Darène and starring Dany Robin, Raymond Pellegrin and Micheline Dax. It draws some inspiration from the poem of the same name by Alfred de Musset.

Cast
 Dany Robin as Mimi Pinson  
 Raymond Pellegrin as Frédéric de Montazel 
 Jacqueline Cadet as Tounette  
 Micheline Dax as Mme. Louise  
 Patrick Dewaere as Le frère de Mimi  
 Marc Doelnitz as Valentin  
 Roger Dumas as Pierrot  
 Mireille Granelli as Patricia  
 Denise Grey as La grand-mère  
 Robert Hirsch as Jean-Lou  
 André Luguet as Stevenson  
 Gina Manès as Une vielle dame  
 Frédéric O'Brady as Keratopoulo  
 Louisette Rousseau

References

Bibliography
 Dayna Oscherwitz & MaryEllen Higgins. The A to Z of French Cinema. Scarecrow Press, 2009.

External links
 

1958 films
1958 comedy-drama films
1950s French-language films
French comedy-drama films
Films based on works by Alfred de Musset
Films directed by Robert Darène
1958 comedy films
1958 drama films
1950s French films